Wrestling Dontaku 2022 was an professional wrestling event promoted by New Japan Pro-Wrestling (NJPW). It was held on May 1, 2022, in Fukuoka, at the Fukuoka PayPay Dome, marking the first time that Wrestling Dontaku was held at the venue since 2000.

Storylines 
Wrestling Dontaku featured eight professional wrestling matches that involved different wrestlers from pre-existing scripted feuds and storylines. Wrestlers portray villains, heroes, or less distinguishable characters in the scripted events that build tension and culminate in a wrestling match or series of matches.

Results

Notes

References

2022
2022 in professional wrestling
May 2022 events in Japan